Marc-André Morin (born March 13, 1951) is a Canadian politician, who was elected to the House of Commons of Canada in the 2011 election. He represented the electoral district of Laurentides—Labelle as a member of the New Democratic Party.

Prior to being elected, Morin was an environmentalist and journalist. He has previously worked in forestry and construction in the Yukon. On March 1, 2015, he lost the NDP nomination for the next general election to local doctor Simon-Pierre Landry.

References

External links

1951 births
Living people
New Democratic Party MPs
Members of the House of Commons of Canada from Quebec
21st-century Canadian politicians